Dejan Cukic may refer to:
Dejan Cukić, Serbian musician
Dejan Čukić, Danish/Montenegrin actor